Anthony William Burton (born 15 April 1975) is a former English cricketer.  Burton was a right-handed batsman who bowled right-arm fast-medium.  He was born in Ripon, Yorkshire.

Burton represented the Yorkshire Cricket Board in a single List A match against the Gloucestershire Cricket Board in the 1999 NatWest Trophy.  In his only List A match, he scored an unbeaten 2 runs, while with the ball he took 3 wickets at a bowling average of 10.00, ending with figures of 3/30.

References

External links
Anthony Burton at Cricinfo
Anthony Burton at CricketArchive

1975 births
Living people
Cricketers from Ripon
English cricketers
Yorkshire Cricket Board cricketers